Laminacauda orina is a species of sheet weaver found in Peru. It was described by Chamberlin in 1916.

References

Linyphiidae
Invertebrates of Peru
Spiders of South America
Spiders described in 1916